Keith William Stackpole (31 July 1916 – 19 September 1992) was an Australian rules footballer who played with Collingwood and Fitzroy in the Victorian Football League (VFL).

Stackpole made his VFL debut in 1935 with Collingwood and played as a reserve in that year's winning Grand Final as well as their premiership triumph the following season. Due to the success of Collingwood the competition for a place in the side was tough and as a result he left the club for Fitzroy during the 1939 VFL season. Stackpole formed a strong partnership with fellow Fitzroy rover Allan Ruthven and his last game of football was their 1944 Grand Final win in which he kicked 2 goals.

After leaving the league Stackpole joined Victorian Football Association (VFA) club Prahran as captain and coach, kicking 85 goals in his first season. He also became a Victorian first-class cricketer, making 1025 runs at 34.16 from 20 matches. His son, also named Keith, would play Test cricket for Australia.

See also
 List of Victoria first-class cricketers

References

Cricinfo profile

1916 births
1992 deaths
Australian rules footballers from Melbourne
Fitzroy Football Club players
Fitzroy Football Club Premiership players
Collingwood Football Club players
Collingwood Football Club Premiership players
Prahran Football Club players
Prahran Football Club coaches
Australian cricketers
Victoria cricketers
Three-time VFL/AFL Premiership players
Cricketers from Melbourne